The World Egg Throwing Federation is an organization that promotes the sport of egg throwing. It promotes a number of different variations of games including Russian egg roulette, throw and catch, static relay, target throwing and egg trebuchet. The organization discourages the use of eggs in the role of vandalism. The championship has been held annually in Swaton, England since 2006.

References

External links
 The World Egg Throwing Federation home page

Eggs in culture
North Kesteven District
Organisations based in Lincolnshire
Sport in Lincolnshire
Culture in Lincolnshire
Organizations established in 2006